Stuart Rafferty (born 6 March 1961) is a Scottish former footballer, who played as a midfielder for Motherwell, Dundee, Dunfermline Athletic before ending his career with his local club Greenock Morton.

External links
 

Living people
1961 births
People from Port Glasgow
Scottish footballers
Scottish Football League players
Dundee F.C. players
Dunfermline Athletic F.C. players
Motherwell F.C. players
Greenock Morton F.C. players
Association football midfielders
Footballers from Inverclyde